The Autonomous University of Aguascalientes (in ) is a Mexican public university based in the city of Aguascalientes, Mexico.

The Autonomous University of Aguascalientes has several campuses that are located across the state. The university was founded on June 19, 1973, its preceding institution, The School of Agriculture (in ), was founded on January 15, 1867. The Autonomous University of Aguascalientes currently offers 64 different bachelor's degrees, 15 master's degrees and 9 doctoral degrees.

Its library is named after poet and university president Desiderio Macías Silva, and holds over 183,063 volumes.

The UAA also operates a radio station, XHUAA-FM 94.5, and a television station (UAA TV) available on cable providers in the city.

Digital television
XHCGA-TDT is authorized to broadcast a television service known as "AGS TV" on digital subchannel 26.2. In actuality, this station is UAA TV, the television service of the Universidad Autónoma de Aguascalientes, which began broadcasting over XHCGA-TDT on August 7, 2017.

Gallery

References

External links

Autonomous University of Aguascalientes
Universities and colleges in Aguascalientes
Educational institutions established in 1973
1973 establishments in Mexico